KBYH may refer to:

 Arkansas International Airport (ICAO code KBYH)
 KBYH-LP, a low-power radio station (102.7 FM) licensed to serve Midland, Texas, United States